Iliyas Azmi (born 22 August 1934) is an Indian politician. He is a member of parliament from Uttar Pradesh. He represented Shahabad (Lok Sabha constituency) in 2004 and Kheri (Lok Sabha constituency) in 2009 from Bahujan Samaj Party. He later joined Aam Aadmi Party, and quit Aam Aadmi Party and PAC in 2016.

Life 
He was born on 22 August 1934 at Sadarpur Barauli-Phulpur in Azamgarh district, Uttar Pradesh. His father's name is Mohammed Maruf.

He married Late Smt. Badarunnisa on 2 May 1950. He has four sons and four daughters. He was educated at Roztul Olum, Phulpur as a Hafiz.

Positions Held 

 1980-86: General Secretary, Muslim Majlis, Uttar Pradesh.
 1986-87: Vice-President, Muslim Majlis, Uttar Pradesh.
 1987-89: President, Muslim Majlis, Uttar Pradesh.
 President, All India Muslim Majlis.
 1996: Elected to eleventh Lok Sabha.

Books Published

Hindi Books 

 'Sampardayikta Kulin Tantra Ki Jarurat.'
 Baba Saheb Bhimrao Ambedkar.'
 'Periyar Rama Swami Naikar.'
 'Insan aur Devta.'

Urdu Books 

 'Payame Zindgi.'
 'Musalamano Ki Siyasat Jakham aur Ilaz.'
 'Harijano Ki Moraot.'
 'Iran Ka Islami Inklab Hakikat Ke Aiane Mein.'
 'Kagia Darululum Ya Bainajakwami Sazish'

References

External links
 Official biographical sketch in Parliament of India website

1934 births
Living people
20th-century Indian Muslims
21st-century Indian Muslims
People from Azamgarh
People from Hardoi
India MPs 1996–1997
India MPs 2004–2009
Aam Aadmi Party politicians
Lok Sabha members from Uttar Pradesh
Bahujan Samaj Party politicians from Uttar Pradesh
India MPs 2009–2014
People from Hardoi district